Madior may refer to:

 Elhadjy Madior N'Diaye (born 1983), Senegalese football (soccer) defender
 Mame Madior Boye (born 1940), former Prime Minister of Senegal